Sir Stephen Henry Molyneux Killik, GBE, KCVO (1861 – 17 April 1938) was a British stockbroker. He was Lord Mayor of London from 1934 to 1935.

External links 
 

1861 births
1938 deaths
Knights Bachelor
20th-century lord mayors of London
Aldermen of the City of London
Sheriffs of the City of London
Knights Grand Cross of the Order of the British Empire
Knights Commander of the Royal Victorian Order
British stockbrokers